Pavel Moulis (born 7 April 1991) is a professional Czech football player who currently plays for FK Dukla Prague. He has played over 100 matches in the Czech First League, mainly for FK Teplice.

References

External links
 
 

Czech footballers
1991 births
Living people
Association football midfielders
People from Teplice
FK Teplice players
FK Ústí nad Labem players
FK Jablonec players
1. FK Příbram players
SK Sigma Olomouc players
Sportspeople from the Ústí nad Labem Region
Czech National Football League players
FK Dukla Prague players